Snell station is a light rail station operated by Santa Clara Valley Transportation Authority (VTA). The station is served by the Blue Line of the VTA Light Rail system. It was part of the original Guadalupe Line, the first segment of light rail from Santa Teresa to Tasman. Snell station is located in the median of State Route 85, near Snell Avenue in the southern part of San Jose, California.

References

External links 

Santa Clara Valley Transportation Authority light rail stations
Santa Clara Valley Transportation Authority bus stations
Railway stations in San Jose, California
Railway stations in the United States opened in 1987
1987 establishments in California